"Pirate" is a song recorded by American singer and actress Cher, released as the first single from her 14th album Cherished (1977). The song debuted at #96 on the Billboard Hot 100 on the issue date of January 15, peaking at #93 the following week.

Weekly charts

References

1977 singles
1977 songs
Cher songs
Warner Records singles
Songs written by Steve Dorff
Song recordings produced by Snuff Garrett